Upstate New York is a storied region in North American athletics.

Sports

Baseball 
Although now largely discredited, the report of the 1905-1907 Mills Commission, charged with investigating the origins of baseball, named Cooperstown as the place where baseball was invented in the 1830s or 1840s by Abner Doubleday. Cooperstown is the home of the National Baseball Hall of Fame and Museum.

Basketball 
The first away game in the sport of basketball was played at the Albany YMCA gymnasium in 1892, the year after the sport was invented in nearby Springfield College in Massachusetts.

Major league teams 
Upstate New York was once the home of major league sports teams such as the Troy Trojans and the Syracuse Stars of the National League, the Buffalo Braves, Rochester Royals and the Syracuse Nationals of the National Basketball Association, the Buffalo Blues of the short-lived baseball Federal League and several teams of various sports named the Buffalo Bisons.

The only teams in North America's major leagues that call Upstate New York home are the NFL's Buffalo Bills and the NHL's Buffalo Sabres. Buffalo is home to the Buffalo Beauts of the National Women's Hockey League and the Buffalo Bandits of the National Lacrosse League.

Rochester boasts a top-level team in sports not considered as "major" in the U.S. the Rochester Knighthawks of the National Lacrosse League.

Football 
The New York Pro Football League was an informal circuit of teams based in various cities across upstate New York; they would compete primarily in local circuits before participating in what is believed to be the first playoff tournament in professional football, which culminated in a Thanksgiving championship at Buffalo Baseball Park. The NYPFL was one of several regional leagues that foreshadowed the formation of the National Football League; several NYPFL teams joined the NFL over the course of the 1920s. As of 2012, the only professional football team in the territory is the Buffalo Bills of the NFL. Although the region has hosted indoor football teams in the past, no teams currently play in the region.

Collegiate athletics 
The collegiate sports programs at Syracuse University (Syracuse Orange, football and basketball) and Cornell University (Cornell Big Red, primarily hockey) attract significant regional attention. In Western New York, the UB Bulls are the most widely known college football team, while in basketball, the regional "Big 4" rivalry between UB, the Canisius Golden Griffins, the Niagara Purple Eagles and St. Bonaventure Bonnies takes prominence. Siena College, Loudonville, NY, Men's Basketball team in 2008 (Vanderbilt) as a 13-seed and in 2009 (Ohio St.) as a 9-seed, upset major programs to advance to second of their respected NCAA Tournaments. The St. Bonaventure women's basketball team reached the Sweet 16 of the 2012 NCAA Division I women's basketball tournament, and the Buffalo Bulls women's basketball team reach the Sweet 16 of the 2018 NCAA Division 1 Women's Basketball Tournament. Upstate's numerous SUNY colleges compete in the State University of New York Athletic Conference, at Division III in the NCAA; the SUNYAC houses several college ice hockey powerhouses, including the Oswego Lakers and Plattsburgh Cardinals, who share a heated rivalry.

Minor league teams 
Rochester is home to several Minor League sports teams, including hockey's Americans (or "Amerks" as known locally) and baseball's Red Wings. Other Upstate New York minor league professional sports teams include the Syracuse Mets of the Triple-A baseball International League, the Binghamton Rumble Ponies of the Double-A baseball Eastern League, the Binghamton Devils, Syracuse Crunch and Adirondack Thunder of the ECHL, the Albany Patroons of the Continental Basketball Association; and the Auburn Doubledays, the Tri-City ValleyCats and the Batavia Muckdogs of the Class A baseball New York–Penn League (NYPL). Another Upstate team, the Jamestown Jammers, played in the NYPL before moving to Morgantown, West Virginia in 2015. The Perfect Game Collegiate Baseball League and New York Collegiate Baseball League operate within upstate New York.

Native American teams 
The First Nations Lacrosse Association organizes the Iroquois Nationals (men) and Haudenosaunee Nationals (women), which are the national lacrosse teams of the Six Nations of the Iroquois Confederacy that competes in international competition. It represents the Iroquois reservations in the United States, the Grand River reservation in Ontario and the Seven Nations in Quebec. The team was admitted to the International Lacrosse Federation (ILF), since superseded by the Federation of International Lacrosse (FIL), in 1990 and is the only Native American/First Nations team sanctioned to compete in any sport internationally.

Auto racing 
In auto racing, Watkins Glen International Speedway is the major race track in the area and hosts annual races in the NASCAR Cup Series and Xfinity Series as well as the IMSA WeatherTech SportsCar Championship and the Sports Car Club of America. Holland Speedway in Holland hosts races in the Whelen All-American Series. In addition, numerous smaller speedways and dirt tracks exist in Little Valley, Freedom, Humphrey, Granby (serving the city of Fulton), Oswego, Lancaster, Ransomville and numerous other cities and towns.

Athletes 

 Billy Backus, boxer from Canastota
 Carmen Basilio, boxer from Canastota
 Dustin Brown, right wing for and captain of the NHL's Los Angeles Kings, from Ithaca.
 Jehuu Caulcrick, Clymer native and NFL fullback
 Funny Cide, the first New York-bred horse to win the Kentucky Derby
 Laura Diaz, LPGA golfer from Scotia
 Jimmer Fredette, current NBA player for the Sacramento Kings, born and raised in Glens Falls.
 Tim Green, Professional American football player from Liverpool, NY. Played for Syracuse University
 Walter Hagen, early American golfer, holds 11 majors, 3rd behind Jack Nicklaus and Tiger Woods.
 Baby Joe Mesi, heavyweight boxing contender from Tonawanda
 Matt Morris, professional baseball player, graduate of Valley Central High school in Montgomery
 Joe Nathan, professional baseball, graduate of Pine Bush High school
 Jason Motte, professional baseball player, graduate of Valley Central High school in Montgomery
 Dottie Pepper, LPGA golfer from Saratoga Springs
 Andy Van Slyke, professional baseball player from Utica
 Abby Wambach, longtime USA national soccer team member and the all-time leading goal scorer in international soccer for either sex; born and raised in Rochester, and played there professionally for much of her later career.
 Wayne Levi - Professional Golfer from Herkimer, NY
 Miles Joseph - Professional soccer player from Clifton Park, NY
 Brendan Harris - Professional baseball player from Glens Falls, NY
 Tim Stauffer - Professional baseball player from Saratoga, NY
 Johnny Podres- 1955 World Series MVP (Brooklyn Dodgers) - Port Henry, NY
 Ernie Davis, 1961 Heisman Trophy Winner from Elmira
 "Hacksaw" Jim Duggan – professional wrestler of Mid-South, WWF and WCW fame. Glens Falls native
 Dave LaPoint – retired Major League Baseball pitcher and 1982 World Series champion; owner of Dave LaPoint's
 Dave Palmer – retired Major League Baseball pitcher; born in Glens Falls

Athletic events 
 The "Miracle on Ice"
 The 1932 Winter Olympics and the 1980 Winter Olympics, both held at Lake Placid
 The Tour de New York bicycle race
 The Boilermaker Road Race in Utica
 The inaugural NHL Winter Classic, held in Buffalo in 2008

Athletic leagues 
 Empire Football League, which houses the oldest surviving semi-professional football club in the United States, the Watertown Red & Black, founded in 1896.
 Liberty League
 Mid-State Athletic Conference
 New York Pro Football League
 Northeastern Football Alliance
 Upstate New York Club Hockey League

See also 
 Sports in New York (state)
 Sports in Buffalo
 Sports in New York's Capital District
 Sports in Rochester
 Sports in Syracuse

References

Sports in New York (state)
New York (state) sports-related lists
Upstate New York